A Million Lights - Live at the O2 is the first live long-form video by English recording artist Cheryl.

Track listing 

Source:

Charts

References 

Live video albums
2012 video albums